Uplander or Uplanders may refer to:

Uplander, another name for a highlander
Polish Uplanders, a subethnic group of Poles that mostly live in the Central Beskidian Range of the Subcarpathian highlands
Chevrolet Uplander, a minivan manufactured and marketed by Chevrolet for the model years of 2005 to 2009

See also
Upland (disambiguation)